After Burner: Black Falcon is a 2007 arcade-style combat flight simulation video game. It is the fifth game in the After Burner series and, unlike previous games in the series, it is exclusive to the PlayStation Portable and not a port of an arcade game.

Overview
The game's plot sees a terrorist cell dubbed Black Falcon hijacking 13 prototype fighter jets dubbed "Assassin" from the CIA. There are three different pilots to choose from, each with their own plot-twists. Players will be tasked with making the skies friendly again by screeching through the skies in an assortment of 19 originally designed planes, including the F-14D Tomcat, the F-22 Raptor and the F-15E Strike Eagle. Each of the planes can be customized with a variety of weapons, items and custom paint jobs. The game supports "numerous multiplayer challenges" in both eight-player competitive and two-player cooperative modes.

Reception

The game received "average" reviews according to video game review aggregator Metacritic.

References

External links

2007 video games
Flight simulation video games
PlayStation Portable games
PlayStation Portable-only games
Sega video games
Video games developed in the United States
Multiplayer and single-player video games
Video games using Havok
Planet Moon Studios games

sv:After Burner (spelserie)#After Burner: Black Falcon